Adolf Christen (7 August 1811 – 13 July 1883) was a Bavarian stage actor, theater director and theater manager of the old Munich "Aktientheater".

Christen was born in Berlin. When the father of the actress Klara Ziegler died he got the wardship of her. First he declined her wish to become actress but later he taught her. In 1876 he married her.

He died in Munich. The family grave is at the Old Southern Cemetery in Munich.

References

External links 
 

German male stage actors
German theatre managers and producers
German theatre directors
Male actors from Berlin
1811 births
1883 deaths
Burials at the Alter Südfriedhof
19th-century German male actors